Union Sportive Parisienne was a football club based in Paris, France. The club was founded circa 1897 and ceased operations in 1909. Red and black were the club colours.

In the 1900s, the club participated in eight seasons of the Championnat de Paris organized by the Union des Sociétés Françaises de Sports Athlétiques. Five of the club's players played for the France national team in its early years, including three in the team's first match in 1904. In 1908, US Parisienne participated in the Torneo Internazionale Stampa Sportiva, where they faced two clubs from Turin, Torino and Juventus. Ahead of the 1909–10 season, the club ceased operations.

Notable players 

  Georges Crozier
  Jacques Davy
  Maurice Guichard
  Marius Royet
  Paul Zeiger

References 

Parisienne
Football clubs in Paris
Association football clubs established in the 1890s
1890s establishments in France
Association football clubs disestablished in 1909
1909 disestablishments in France